Qadirpur Ran (Urdu: قادِرپُور راں) is a city in the Multan District of Punjab, Pakistan. The city has fourteen wards and three Union Councils: Qadirpur Ran City, Sharqi and Gharbi.  

The most commonly spoken language in the city is Saraiki.  

Qadirpur Ran is situated on lahore multan highway in an agricultural area known for its mangoes and oranges. The main roads in the city are Tatypur Road, Riazabad Road, Mattital Road, Khanewal Multan Road and Hospital Road.It contains all facility of a Tehseel.
Nadra Office, Passport Office, Rescue 1122 Office, Land Record Arazi center Office. It has a high standard living housing society named as Rahat Garden City Qadirpur Raan.DHA Shahruken e Alam gate is adjacent to Qadirpur Raan City which makes it very important.

Education 
Qadirpur Ran has primary and secondary educational institutions. Virtual University of Pakistan is accessible online.

Colleges and Universities 
The higher education institutions are 
Government Boys Degree College Qadirpur Raan,
Government Girls Degree College Qadirpur Raan,
The NFC Institute of Engineering and Technology, and Bahauddin Zakariya University (formerly Multan University) located in Multan.

Elementary and Secondary Schools 

Quaid e azam public school, Qadirpur Raan Campus
 Allama Iqbal Public School
 Al-Ilm Public School
 Saadat Public School, Boys Branch
 The Perfect Educators School
 Government boys Higher Secondary School
 Government Girls Higher secondary  School
 Allied School, Qadirpur Raan Campus
 Madni Qadri School
 The Educators School
 Dar e Arqam School
 Paradise Education School
 Usman Ghani Public School
 Government Girls Primary School Dheely Wala
 Government Girls Primary School Bahoo Wala
 Government primary school Qadir pur ran no.1. The biggest school in punjab (strength & quality of education)

References 

Populated places in Multan District